Wincenty Antonowicz (May 1, 1891 – 1984), along with his wife Jadwiga (1896–1942) and daughter Lucyna Antonowicz-Bauer (b. 1927), were the Polish family from Wilno (now Vilnius, Lithuania) who sheltered the 20-year-old Jewish woman Bronisława Malberg (b. 1917) in their house after the liquidation of the Wilno Ghetto during the Nazi German occupation of Poland in World War II, as well as two other Jewish families including Henia and Adi Kulgan. For their heroism, Wincenty and his wife Jadwiga were posthumously bestowed the titles of Righteous Among the Nations by Yad Vashem on June 14, 1998.

See also
 Jewish ghettos in German-occupied Poland
 The Holocaust in Poland

References

 Stanislaw Wronski, Maria Zwolakowa,: "Polacy Zydzi, 1939-1945". Warszawa, Książka i Wiedza Publishers, 1971. (illustrated, 462 pages) including copies of many original documents.

People from Vilnius
People from Vilensky Uyezd
Polish Righteous Among the Nations